The West Sequoia League is a high school athletic league that is part of the CIF Central Section.

Members
 Caruthers High School
 Minarets High School
 Orange Cove High School
 Fowler High School
 Parlier High School
 Orosi High School
 Riverdale High School

References

CIF Central Section